Epifanio Ang Bilas Ko: NB-Eye is a 1995 Philippine action comedy film written and directed by Jett Espiritu. The film stars Leo Martinez and Dennis Padilla. It is a parody of the 1994 film Epimaco Velasco NBI.

Plot
Epifanio (Leo) and Panfilo (Dennis) run a private eye agency owned by their father-in-law (Rudy).

Cast
 Leo Martinez as Epifanio
 Dennis Padilla as Panfilo
 Jean Garcia as Emma
 Jackie Aquino as Lily
 Romy Diaz as Ben
 Emily Loren
 Maita Sanchez
 Rudy Meyer as Father
 Dexter Doria as Madonna
 Romy Romulo

References

External links

1995 films
1995 comedy films
Filipino-language films
Philippine comedy films
Viva Films films
Merdeka Film Productions films
Films directed by Jett C. Espiritu